The Municipality of Vitanje is a municipality below the slopes of Pohorje in northeastern Slovenia. Its seat is the town of Vitanje. The area is part of the traditional region of Styria. The municipality is now included in the Savinja Statistical Region.

Geography

Settlements
In addition to the municipal seat of Vitanje, the municipality also includes the following settlements:

 Brezen
 Hudinja
 Ljubnica
 Paka
 Spodnji Dolič
 Stenica
 Vitanjsko Skomarje

Administration
The current mayor is Slavko Vetrih.

References

External links
 
 Municipality of Vitanje website
 Municipality of Vitanje at Geopedia

Vitanje
1995 establishments in Slovenia